Nantua (Arpitan: Nantuat) is a commune in and subprefecture of the Ain département in the Auvergne-Rhône-Alpes region in Eastern France. In 2019, it had a population of 3,454. The commune of Nantua comprises the glacial Lac de Nantua.

Located in the Haut-Bugey historical region, among the southern foothills of the Jura Mountains, it is famous for its fresh-water fish and crayfish.

History
The town grew up around a Benedictine monastery founded in 671 by Amandus and the church of St Peter where the body of Charles the Bald was initially buried.

The priory of Nantua was sacked and burned in 1230 by Stephen I of Thoire-Villars. Boniface of Savoy was selected prior in 1232.

In 1944, a hundred men were arrested and deported and the local French Secret Army leader was shot dead by the Nazis in response to French resistance activities.

Demographics

Climate
Nantua faces the small Lac de Nantua on its west side and is protected by high cliffs on its landward sides which gives rise to a relatively mild continental climate.

Twin towns — sister cities
Nantua is twinned with:

  Brembilla, Italy (2011)

See also
Communes of the Ain department
Sauce Nantua

References

External links

 Town council website (in French)
 Tourism office website (in French)

Communes of Ain
Subprefectures in France
Bugey
Ain communes articles needing translation from French Wikipedia